Boris Petrushansky (born 3 June 1949 in Moscow) is a Russian-Italian pianist.

Petrushansky started an intercontinental concert career in the mid-1970s after graduating from the Moscow Conservatory. Among his teachers were Heinrich Neuhaus and Lev Naumov. After the collapse of the Soviet Union he settled in Italy.

Petrushansky's recordings of Shostakovich's complete piano solo music have received generally favorable reviews.

He teaches at the Imola Piano Academy.

References

Accademia Ducale, Genova

External links
Official website

Living people
1949 births
Russian classical pianists
Male classical pianists
Prize-winners of the Leeds International Pianoforte Competition
21st-century classical pianists
21st-century Russian male musicians